Ekow Duker is a fiction author living and working in Johannesburg, South Africa, most notably recognised for his novel White Wahala, which was shortlisted for the European Union Literary Award in 2011/2012. Duker was educated in Ghana, the United Kingdom, the United States, and France. He worked as an oil field engineer before becoming a banker, and then as an author. Aside from writing, Ekow works as a corporate strategist and in banking.

Works
Ekow Duker self-published his first book, before being signed with Pan MacMillan.

Fiction
 White Wahala (2014)
 Dying in New York (2014)
 What will we do about Frikkie? (2015)

Personal life
Ekow Duker was married in 2009 and has two children, Nathan Duker and Noemi Duker. His wife, Thando Duker, died in 2012 due to a liver condition, but he later remarried to Bridget Duker.

Duker is a devout Christian and expresses these views in his writing.

References

http://www.ekowduker.com/

Living people
South African male novelists
Year of birth missing (living people)